Charles M. Ryan is a game designer who has worked primarily on role-playing games.

Career
Charles Ryan's company Chameleon Eclectic had been publishing games such as Millennium's End (1992) and Psychosis (1994) in Blacksburg, Virginia. Ryan was later working at Last Unicorn Games when Wizards of the Coast purchased the company, and was the only employee to relocate to Seattle when Bill Slavicsek opted to close down the Los Angeles office of Last Unicorn in December 2000. In 2011, Cubicle 7 increased its staff by hiring experienced game designers like Ryan, Gareth Ryder-Hanrahan, Walt Ciechanowski, and Neil Ford.

His D&D editing and design work includes the 3.5 revisions of the Player's Handbook, Monster Manual, and Dungeon Master's Guide (2003), the Miniatures Handbook (2003), the Dragonlance Campaign Setting book (2003), Draconomicon (2003), Unearthed Arcana (2004), and Monster Manual III (2010).

References

External links
 
 Home page

American game designers
Dungeons & Dragons game designers
Living people
Place of birth missing (living people)
Year of birth missing (living people)